Nightlands is an American band, a side-project of The War on Drugs bassist Dave Hartley.

Nightlands' 2017 album "I Can Feel the Night Around Me" received positive reviews from PopMatters, Under the Radar, Pitchfork, and other music publications.

Members
Anthony LaMarca - drums 
Eliza Hardy Jones - keys and vocals 
Jesse Hale Moore - keys and vocals 
Scott Churchman - bass

Discography
 Forget the Mantra (Secretly Canadian, 2010)
 Oak Island (Secretly Canadian, 2013)
 I Can Feel the Night Around Me (Western Vinyl, 2017)

Moonshine  (Western Vinyl, 2022)

References

External links
Nightlands at Western_Vinyl

Indie rock musical groups from Pennsylvania
Musical groups from Philadelphia
Western Vinyl artists
Secretly Canadian artists